Júlio Requena is a Paralympic athlete from Spain competing mainly in category T11 sprint events.

Playing career
Requena first competed in the Paralympics in his home country in 1992 where he won a gold medal as part of the B1>B3 4×100 m relay team and in 100 m as well as a silver medal in the 200 m.  The following games in Atlanta in 1996 he won the 100 m, 200 m and was part of the victorious 4×100 m as well as competing in the 400 m.  The 2000 Summer Paralympics gave him a further two medals, both bronzes in the 200 m and 4×100 m as he also competed in the 100 m.

References

Paralympic athletes of Spain
Athletes (track and field) at the 1992 Summer Paralympics
Athletes (track and field) at the 1996 Summer Paralympics
Athletes (track and field) at the 2000 Summer Paralympics
Paralympic gold medalists for Spain
Paralympic silver medalists for Spain
Paralympic bronze medalists for Spain
Living people
Medalists at the 1992 Summer Paralympics
Medalists at the 1996 Summer Paralympics
Medalists at the 2000 Summer Paralympics
Year of birth missing (living people)
Paralympic medalists in athletics (track and field)
Spanish male sprinters
Visually impaired sprinters
Paralympic sprinters